Guide to League of Nations Publications: A Bibliographical Survey of the Work of the League, 1920—1947 is a book of the German-American political scientist Hans Aufricht; it is a bibliographic review of the activities of the League of Nations for the entire period of its existence; the work — that includes an introduction to the topic, a list of documents published by various organs of the League, and a “good” index — was first published in 1951.

References 

 Max Gunzenhäuser. Die Pariser Friedenskonferenz 1919 und die Friedensverträge 1919–1920. Literaturbericht und Bibliographie : [de]. — Frankfurt/M. : Bernard & Graefe, 1970. — vii, 287 S. — (Schriften der Bibliothek für Zeitgeschichte, Stuttgart: Heft 9).
 B. K. Guide to League of Nations Publications: a Bibliographical Survey of the Work of the League 1920–47 // International Affairs. — 1952. — October (vol. 28, iss. 4). — P. 481. — ISSN 0020-5850. — DOI:10.2307/2604195.
 Marie J. Carroll. Review of Guide to League of Nations Publications // The American Journal of International Law. — 1952. — April (vol. 46, iss. 2). — P. 379–381. — DOI:10.2307/2194087.
 Josef L. Kunz. Review of Guide to League of Nations Publications // The Western Political Quarterly. — 1952. — June (vol. 5, iss. 2). — P. 296–297. — DOI:10.2307/443316.
 Hessel E. Yntema. H. Aufricht: Guide to League of Nations Publications // The American Journal of Comparative Law. — 1953. — 1 April (vol. 2, iss. 2). — P. 255. — ISSN 0002-919X. — DOI:10.2307/837310.
 Guide to League of Nations Publications; A Bibliographical Survey of the Work of the League, 1920–1947. By Hans Aufricht. (New York: Columbia University Press. 1951. Pp. xix, 682. $10.00.) // American Political Science Review. — 1952. — March (vol. 46, iss. 1). — P. 266. — ISSN 0003-0554. — DOI:10.1017/S0003055400298894.
 H. W. Review of Guide to League of Nations Publications [de] // Die Friedens-Warte. — 1951. — Bd. 51. — S. 289.
 Erich Hula. Review of Guide to League of Nations Publications: A Bibliographical Survey of the Work of the League, 1920-1947 // Social Research. — 1953. — Autumn (vol. 20, iss. 3). — P. 374–375.
 Review of Guide to League of Nations Publications. A Bibliographical Survey of the Work of the League, 1920–1947 (Führer durch die Veröffentlichungen des Völkerbunds. Eine bibliographische Übersicht der Arbeit des Völkerbunds 1920–1947) [de] // Zeitschrift für ausländisches und internationales Privatrecht. — 1952. — Bd. 17, H. 2. — S. 314.
 C. A. MacArtney. Review of Guide to League of Nations Publications // The English Historical Review. — 1953. — January (vol. 68, iss. 266). — P. 160.

External links 
 

1951 non-fiction books
English-language books
History books about World War II
Columbia University Press books
League of Nations